Sid Robinson was a former Australian professional soccer player who played as a full-back for Pyrmont and the Australia national soccer team.

International career
Mitchell began his international career with Australia in an international friendly, debuting in a 2–1 win over New Zealand as their first win in an international match. After his official international career, he played two extra matches against the English FA touring side in June–July 1925.

Career statistics

International

References

Australian soccer players
Association football defenders
Australia international soccer players